"Georgia" is a song by Australian singer-songwriter Vance Joy. The song was released on 26 February 2015 as the third single from his debut studio album Dream Your Life Away (2014). The song  has peaked at number 15 on the Australian Singles Chart.

"Georgia" is a homage not only to a girl and falling in love, but also to Ray Charles' song "Georgia on My Mind".

Joy names "Georgia" as one of his favourite songs on the album.

It featured in the Australian soap opera Neighbours on 8 April 2016, when long running character Kyle Canning (Chris Milligan) left the show to reunite with his wife, Georgia Brooks (Saskia Hampele).

Background
Joy began writing "Georgia" in 2006, then sat on it until he figured out the words and melody eight years later. "It was New Year's Day in 2014, and I just sat down and started playing those chords," he says. "Somehow, I just found the right combination, found a way to put words over the top of the riff that sounded right. That's always a magic moment."

Video
The video was directed by Luci Schroder whom he worked with on the video for previous single "Mess Is Mine". It premiered on YouTube on March 26. The video shows a battalion of soldiers in a deadly battle during some unspecified war. At one point, two soldiers are ambushed, and one of them is seriously wounded and the soldiers intimately kiss. It then shows several crew members filming the battle become overwhelmed with emotion.

"When you get a good pitch like Luci's, it makes it easy for me to say 'yes' to it because I think it stands out," the singer says. "One of the goals when deciding on a [music video] is you want something to be memorable or at least to spark some kind of thought or resonate with people in a way."

The Luci Schroder directed music video was nominated for Best Video at the ARIA Music Awards of 2015.

Track listing

Charts

Weekly charts

Year-end charts

Certifications

References

2015 singles
2014 songs
Vance Joy songs
Songs written by Vance Joy